Jamsrangiin Tseveen (often romanized to Jamtsarano), (1880 – May 14, 1942) was a Buryat scholar and one of the leading figures in Mongolian politics and especially academia in the 1920s.

Early life

Tseveen was born in the Aginsk district of Transbaikalia in 1880. He went to school in Chita and later to Badmaev's Buryat private school in St. Petersburg. From 1898 to 1902, he attended the Teacher's seminary in Irkutsk, where he began to visit neighbouring Buryat clans and to collect epics and materials related to shamanism, and Mongol law.

Scientific career

In 1902 he and his friend Baradin returned to St. Petersburg and became auditors at the St. Petersburg University. A professor arranged for them to travel to Buryatia in 1903 to collect more material. Tseveen went to the northwest Baikal area and Olkhon island, and his work proved successful enough to earn him more research trips over the next years, sponsored by the Russian Committee for the Investigation of Central and Eastern Asia. In 1904 he travelled to Urga and home to Aginsk, in 1905 and 1906 he again travelled to Transbaikalia and Outer Mongolia. From 1907 to 1908 he taught Mongolian at the St. Petersburg University's Faculty of Oriental Languages. In 1909 and 1910 travelled to Inner Mongolia and the Ordos area. In 1911, he travelled to the Tungus at the upper Onon river, and in 1912 he took part in archeological studies at Erdene Zuu, the former site of Karakorum.

In the Bogd Khaanate Mongolia 

After Mongolia had declared independence in 1911, Russia had sent a special envoy to Urga, Ivan Yakovlevich Korostovets. Korostovets planned the creation of a newspaper and the establishment of a secular school under Russian sponsorship, and offered Tseveen to edit the newspaper and supervise the school, both of which Tseveen accepted. In the following years, besides the work at school and the Shine toli ('New Mirror') and Niislel Khüreenii sonin bichig newspapers, he continued academic work and also translated some popular texts into Mongolian.

In the Mongolian People's Republic 

After Outer Mongolia had been occupied by Chinese troops in 1919, Tseveen became a professor at the Irkutsk University. He published articles on Mongolian law, but also travelled around Verkhneudinsk, Kyakhta and Maimaichen, where he met with discontented Outer Mongolians. At the founding congress of the Mongolian People's Revolutionary Party in 1921, Tseveen got the task of writing the Ten Aspirations, the party's platform. After Urga had been liberated from Baron Ungern's troops in the same year, Tseveen founded the Institute of Scriptures and Manuscripts (Sudar Bichgiyn Hüreelen), forerunner of the Mongolian Academy of Sciences. A library was established, and in 1924 a museum was opened. In 1925 he travelled to Leningrad, and in 1926 he married Badmajab Tsedenovna, who was also a Buryat from Aginsk. In the same year, both travelled to Beiping. His wife travelled to Germany and France in 1927 as part of an official mission, but Tseveen remained in Ulaanbaatar.

Exile and death

In 1932, Tseveen was dismissed and exiled to Leningrad, where he again worked at the Institute of Oriental Studies of the University under Nicholas Poppe and edited the milestone Mongol Chronicles of the Seventeenth Century. He was arrested in 1937, convicted to five years imprisonment on February 19, 1940, and died on May 14, 1942 in Sol-Iletsk prison (now known as the Black Dolphin Prison). Details were released by the Russian government in 1993.

Trivia

One of his many interests was research into cryptozoological organisms like the Yeti or the Mongolian Death Worm.

Literature
 "Jamsrano, Peveeniy" in: Sanders, Alan J.K., Historical Dictionary of Mongolia, Lanham (The Scarecrow Press, Inc.) 2003, p. 169.
 Robert A. Rupen: Cyben Žamcaranovic Žamcarano (1880-?1940), in: Harvard Journal of Asiatic Studies, Vol. 19, No. 1/2. (Jun., 1956), pp. 126-145 (subscription needed for online access)

External links
 Biography (in Mongolian)

Mongolian academics
Mongolists
Cryptozoologists
Mongolian People's Party politicians
Prisoners who died in Soviet detention
Mongolian people imprisoned abroad
Mongolian people who died in prison custody
1942 deaths
Buryat politicians
1880 births
Academics from the Russian Empire
Soviet emigrants to Mongolia
Inmates of Black Dolphin Prison
Academic staff of Saint Petersburg State University
Academic staff of Irkutsk State University